Briceni is a village in Dondușeni District, in northern Moldova.

References

Villages of Dondușeni District